Julio Bañuelos (born 7 December 1970) is a Spanish retired footballer who played as a defender, 
He has managed clubs including Alavés and Burgos. He was a graduate of the Barcelona academy. He is head coach at Persija Jakarta

Club career
Born in Miranda de Ebro, Burgos, Castile and León, Bañuelos was a Real Madrid youth graduate. He subsequently represented CD Mirandés, Real Zaragoza B, CD Maspalomas, CF Badalona and CF Balaguer, never playing in a higher level than the Segunda División B.

Coaching career
After his retirement Bañuelos was appointed manager at UE Lleida's youth setup. On 25 April 2001 he moved to Deportivo Alavés, also in charge of the youth sides.

On 5 June 2006, after a spell at the latter's reserve team, Bañuelos was appointed at the helm of the main squad in Segunda División. On 6 September, however, he was relieved from his duties after only two league matches in charge, due to "personal reasons". He was reappointed as the Manager of Alavés in 2008.

In August 2008 Bañuelos was named CD Mirandés manager. He had a successful spell and gained Promotion, after bringing the club back to Segunda División B at first attempt, he left the club in 2010.

On 6 April 2011 Bañuelos was appointed at Burgos CF, and after bringing the club back to the third level, was sacked on 4 October. On 15 January 2013 he joined UE Olot, being relieved from his duties on 10 June.

On 23 May 2014 Bañuelos moved abroad for the first time in his career, being named Thomas Christiansen's assistant at AEK Larnaca F.C. His time at the club saw AEK finish 2nd during the 2014/15 and 2015/16 seasons. Two years later, he followed Christiansen to Cypriot First Division champions APOEL FC. Where he won the Cypriot First Division in his first season, as well as reaching the Cypriot Cup Final, where they finished runners up, the club also reached the Last 16 of the UEFA Europa League. On 27 May 2017, Bañuelos parted company with the club.

He was named Leeds United assistant head coach on Monday 19 June 2017. Bañuelos left the club when Christiansen was dismissed on 4 February 2018, after a poor run of results and with the team tenth in the table.

Managerial statistics

References

External links

Galeria del Futbol Català profile 

1970 births
Living people
Sportspeople from the Province of Burgos
Spanish footballers
Footballers from Castile and León
Association football defenders
Segunda División B players
Tercera División players
CD Mirandés footballers
Real Zaragoza B players
CF Badalona players
Spanish football managers
Deportivo Alavés managers
CD Mirandés managers
Burgos CF managers
UE Olot managers
Spanish expatriate football managers